Louann Donovan (born September 26, 1986) is an American former competitive figure skater. She is the 2004 Nebelhorn Trophy champion and competed in two World Junior Championships, placing as high as sixth.

Career 
Donovan initially played ice hockey. She began taking figure skating lessons after watching Nancy Kerrigan compete at the 1992 Olympics.

Donovan won the junior title at the 2002 U.S. Championships. She was assigned to the 2002 World Junior Championships and placed sixth. The following season, Donovan won a silver medal on the ISU Junior Grand Prix series and then debuted on the senior level at the U.S. Championships, placing ninth. She was sent to the 2003 World Junior Championships and finished tenth.

Donovan won gold in her senior international debut at the 2004 Nebelhorn Trophy. Doing a triple flip after the event, she broke the navicular bone of her right foot in half. As doctors initially believed it was a sprain, she attempted to compete at the 2004 Finlandia Trophy and injured her foot further.

As of 2007, Donovan works as a skating director at the Icenter in Salem, New Hampshire.

Programs

Results

References

External links
 

American female single skaters
1986 births
Living people
Figure skaters from Boston
21st-century American women